Oceanborn is the second studio album by Finnish symphonic metal band Nightwish. It was released in Finland by Spinefarm Records on 7 December 1998 and in the spring of 1999 worldwide. It was released by Drakkar Entertainment in the rest of Europe, and by Toy's Factory in Japan. It is their first album with bassist Sami Vänskä.

Oceanborn has sold more than 68,000 copies in Finland. The single "Sleeping Sun" was released in August 1999, and the song has been included in every reissue of the album since then. The album was released in the US by Century Media in March 2001.

In 2017, Loudwire ranked it as the 10th best power metal album of all time.

Background
Speaking to Kerrang! in 2008, band founder Tuomas Holopainen reminisced that the band got really ambitious after the debut album "that was never meant to be released as a proper record. It happened almost by accident, so we decided to put everything into making Oceanborn great." He added:

According to Kerrang!, "for all its Royal Albert Hall grandiosity, Oceanborn was actually recorded in a Finnish school."

Style
This album marked a definitive change in musical scope for Nightwish from their folk-laden roots in Angels Fall First, showcasing a more bombastic, power metal-oriented sound with faster tempos, harmonic guitar/keyboard leads, and plenty of double-bass-heavy drumwork. During that time, Stratovarius was Holopainen's biggest inspiration, hence the power metal sound of the album. Oceanborns sound hearkens a more dramatic approach in the overall musical scope, mostly relegated to the symphonic keyboard work and lead singer Tarja Turunen's vocals. According to Mape Ollila, who penned the band's biography:

Along with Therion's Theli, the album came to be known as one of the cornerstones of the emerging genre of symphonic metal.

Most of the lyrics are fantasy-themed, with tracks like "Swanheart" and "Walking in the Air", a cover from the animated TV special The Snowman, as typical examples; however, the song "Gethsemane", has a more religious feel to it. In addition, there are also some theatrical tracks like "Devil & the Deep Dark Ocean". Oceanborn is among their darkest albums, making use of the harsh vocals of Tapio Wilska in the songs "The Pharaoh Sails to Orion" and "Devil & the Deep Dark Ocean".

Live performances
Since the album's release, "Sacrament of Wilderness" has remained a fan-favorite at concerts, and it was still performed often until 2003. In 2007 it returned to the setlist but after 2008, it wasn't performed again until the Decades: World Tour in 2018. Both "Sleeping Sun" and "Walking in the Air" have also been performed often on shows. "Walking in the Air" returned to the live set list of the band on 19 September 2009 at Hartwall Areena, as an acoustic song sung by then-vocalist Anette Olzon. Having been dropped from their live shows since Turunen's dismissal in 2005, "Stargazers" returned to the live set list on the Endless Forms Most Beautiful World Tour, with Floor Jansen as their newest singer in 2015.

In recent years, former vocalist Tarja Turunen released covers from two Oceanborn songs: "Stargazers", on a live version (recorded 27 March 2011) that can be heard on the CD/DVD Luna Park Ride; and "Swanheart", also a live recording (April 2013) with Turunen performing accompanied by a symphonic orchestra, choir and Mike Terrana on drums, that can be heard on the CD/DVD Beauty and the Beat. Since leaving the band, she has also still sang in concerts Passion and the Opera, Sleeping Sun and Walking in the Air.

Track listing

Personnel
Credits for Oceanborn adapted from liner notes.NightwishTarja Turunen – lead vocals
Tuomas Holopainen – keyboards, backing vocals, songwriting, lyrics
Emppu Vuorinen – guitars, songwriting
Sami Vänskä – bass
Jukka Nevalainen – drums, percussion, backing vocalsProductionTero Kinnunen – engineering, producer
Mikko Karmila – engineering, mixing
Mika Jussila – mastering
Toni Härkönen – photography
Maria Sandell – artwork
Markus Mayer – re-release cover artAdditional musicians'
Tapio Wilska – additional vocals on "Devil & The Deep Dark Ocean" and "The Pharaoh Sails To Orion", backing vocals on "Moondance"
Esa Lehtinen – flute
Plamen Dimov – violin
Kaisli Kaivola – violin
Markku Palola – viola 
Erkki Hirvikangas – cello

Charts

Album

Singles

Certifications

References

Bibliography

External links
Nightwish's Official Website

1998 albums
Nightwish albums
Spinefarm Records albums
Century Media Records albums